Jollydora is a genus of plant in family Connaraceae. It contains the following species (list may be incomplete):
 Jollydora glandulosa, Schellenb.
 Jollydora pierrei, Gilg

References

Connaraceae
Oxalidales genera
Taxonomy articles created by Polbot